Monika Waidacher (born 9 July 1990) is a Swiss ice hockey player for ZSC Lions and the Swiss national team.

Playing career
She participated at the 2015 IIHF Women's World Championship.

Personal life
Her sisters Isabel Waidacher and Nina Waidacher are also hockey players.

References

External links

1990 births
Living people
Ice hockey people from Zürich
Swiss women's ice hockey forwards
College of St. Scholastica alumni
Swiss expatriate ice hockey people
Swiss expatriate sportspeople in the United States
Olympic ice hockey players of Switzerland
Ice hockey players at the 2018 Winter Olympics